I Wanna Marry "Harry" is an American reality television show that premiered on May 20, 2014, on Fox. The series has a premise similar to Joe Millionaire, and follows twelve American women who are manipulated into believing that they are competing for the affections of Prince Harry. However, in reality the bachelor is Matthew Hicks, a Prince Harry look-alike. On June 12, 2014, it was announced the show was pulled from the air in the US and cancelled after airing only four episodes. Although not broadcast, the last four episodes were made available on Fox.com, Fox NOW, cable On Demand and Hulu. The complete series was broadcast on the ITV2 channel in the UK, on Latin-American E! throughout Latin America (especially in Mexico, Colombia and Argentina) in February 2015, and on Network Ten in Australia.

Background
At first, the contestants are not explicitly told that the bachelor is Prince Harry; they are merely led to make that inference on their own by Hicks' close resemblance, the royal setting of Englefield House, the lavish dates, and being surrounded by real professional servants and a security detail that really does have experience protecting heads of state. Hicks is referred to in the contestants' presence only as "Sir." However, in the 5th episode, Hicks tells Kelly while they are alone that he is Prince Harry, and later the butler Kingsley announces to all seven remaining contestants at the dinner table that "Sir is indeed His Royal Highness Prince Harry of Wales."

In a 2015 interview with Fusion TV, contestant Kimberly Birch explained that the production crew "really messed with us", and "were really trying everything they possibly could to convince us that [Hicks] was [Harry]", including having a member of the crew pose as a therapist who told the contestants that they needed to stop doubting the situation; ultimately, Birch compared it to brainwashing.

Contestant Andrea Fox, in an interview on the Kidd Kraddick in the Morning radio show, said that prior to filming the contestants were told they were going to be on a TV show called "Dream Date" and that it was more about "the experience for the girls" instead of "finding love", and that people with the show kept saying "Don't compare it to The Bachelor".

The butler on the show, only referred to as Kingsley, is portrayed by English actor Paul Leonard.

The series first aired in the USA on May 20, 2014, on Fox. On June 12, 2014, Fox cancelled I Wanna Marry "Harry" after four of the eight produced episodes due to low ratings but announced it would air the remainder on Fox.com, cable On Demand, Fox NOW and Hulu.

It began airing in the UK on ITV2 on Wednesday, June 4, 2014, at 9:00pm.

Ratings
The first episode aired on Fox following the last season 13 American Idol performance show and had a 1.5 household rating, with a 0.7 for adults 18–49. The second show, which followed Riot, had a 1.0 household rating, with a 0.4 for viewers 18–49. The third episode had 1.04 million live + "same day DVR" viewers with a rating for adults 18-49 of 0.4 (adults 18-49 share: 1).

ITV2 broadcast the first and second shows on the same night (June 4, 2014) and the first show drew 286,000 viewers (1.2%) from 9pm-10pm, while the second show drew 274,000 viewers (1.7%) from 10pm to 11pm.

Reviews
Time magazine reviewed the US premiere, comparing it as "weirdly similar, down to minor details" to Joe Millionaire. However, unlike Joe Millionaire, the magazine noted, there is no shame or guilt in the deception, which Time attributed to reality TV learning to become "lighter in tone yet more slick and ruthless."

In the UK The Telegraph headlined its review "fodder for the braindead" and commenting "the floundering Harry lookalike wasn't a wild or weird enough character to carry the show, entertainment derived solely from the foolish bachelorettes." But it picks out the butler, Kingsley, as a "genre-bender of genius" who strays far from his brief.

The bachelor
The bachelor, Matthew Hicks, works for an environmental consultancy firm. He had previously done some very small-scale impersonations of Prince Harry, but otherwise had no prior acting experience. Before filming began, Hicks had his natural blond hair dyed ginger to match Prince Harry's hair colour, and was given brief training in "princely" activities he would need for the show, such as horseback riding, fencing and ballroom dancing. Hicks was also taught extensive information about Prince Harry, to help Hicks be able to respond to contestants appropriately.

Show creator Danny Fenton said in an interview on Good Morning Britain that he talked to over 100 potential Harry look-a-likes from multiple countries before selecting Hicks.

Contestants
The contestants are the following 12 women:

Elimination table

 (WIN) The contestant won the competition.

 (CROWN) The contestant got the Crown Suite.

 (SAFE) The contestant was safe.

 (LEFT) The contestant quit the competition.

 (OUT) The contestant was eliminated.

Aftermath
The series was filmed in August and September 2013. Nine months afterward, Hicks and the winner Kimberly Birch were still in touch and planning to meet up. "We genuinely like each other and have spoken regularly from the moment we stopped filming," said Birch in June 2014.

References

External links
 
 

2010s American reality television series
2014 American television series debuts
2014 American television series endings
American dating and relationship reality television series
English-language television shows
Television series by Ryan Seacrest Productions
Fox Broadcasting Company original programming
Cultural depictions of Prince Harry, Duke of Sussex